Akungba Akoko, commonly called Akungba, is a town in Ondo State, south-western Nigeria. It is the host community to Adekunle Ajasin University.

References

Populated places in Ondo State
Towns in Nigeria